Scranton City Hall is located at Washington and Mulberry (US 11/PA 307) streets in the downtown section of that city in the U.S. state of Pennsylvania. It is a three-story limestone ashlar Victorian Gothic Revival building with sandstone trim, designed by architects Edwin L. Walter and Frederick Lord Brown and built in 1888.

The main building, on Washington Street, houses the offices of city's mayor and other executive officers — city clerk, comptroller and police chief - and those who work under their immediate supervision. A bridge from the second story connects it to the fire department headquarters, facing Mulberry Street, built at the same time by the same architects in the same style. Since the two form a larger complex, they were listed together when the building was added to the National Register of Historic Places in 1981 as Municipal Building and Central Fire Station, 340.

References

City and town halls on the National Register of Historic Places in Pennsylvania
Government buildings completed in 1888
City and town halls in Pennsylvania
Clock towers in Pennsylvania
Buildings and structures in Scranton, Pennsylvania
Gothic Revival architecture in Pennsylvania
Victorian architecture in Pennsylvania
National Register of Historic Places in Lackawanna County, Pennsylvania
Fire stations on the National Register of Historic Places in Pennsylvania